= 4/2 =

4/2 may refer to:

- April 2 (month-day date notation)
- February 4 (day-month date notation)
- 4/2, a time signature
